Werner Krafft is a 1916 German silent drama film directed by Carl Froelich and starring Eduard von Winterstein, Erika Glässner and Reinhold Schünzel.

Cast
 Eduard von Winterstein as Werner Krafft 
 Reinhold Schünzel as Heinz Kleinschmidt 
 Erika Glässner as Erika 
 Sybil Smolova as Anni

References

Bibliography
 Bock, Hans-Michael & Bergfelder, Tim. The Concise CineGraph. Encyclopedia of German Cinema. Berghahn Books, 2009.

External links

1916 films
Films of the German Empire
German silent feature films
Films directed by Carl Froelich
German drama films
1916 drama films
German black-and-white films
Silent drama films
1910s German films
1910s German-language films